The 28th Canadian Parliament was in session from September 12, 1968, until September 1, 1972. The membership was set by the 1968 federal election on June 25, 1968, and it changed only slightly due to resignations and by-elections until it was dissolved prior to the 1972 election.

It was controlled by a Liberal Party majority under Prime Minister Pierre Trudeau and the 20th Canadian Ministry. The Official Opposition was the Progressive Conservative Party led by Robert Stanfield.

The Speaker was Lucien Lamoureux. See also List of Canadian electoral districts 1966-1976 for a list of the ridings in this parliament.

There were four sessions of the 28th Parliament:

Members of the House of Commons
Members of the House of Commons in the 28th parliament arranged by province.

Newfoundland

Prince Edward Island

Nova Scotia

* Russell MacEwan resigned and was replaced by Elmer MacKay in a May 31, 1971 by-election.

New Brunswick

Quebec

* On April 1, 1971 all members of the Ralliement Créditiste rejoined to the Social Credit.
** Bernard Pilon died in office on November 17, 1970.  He was replaced by  Yvon Heureux in a 1971 by-election
*** Bernard Dumont resigned from parliament and was replaced by Léopold Corriveau in a 1970 by-election
**** Roch La Salle quit the Tory party on May 5, 1971, when leader Robert Stanfield rejected a proposal to recognize Canada as being made up of two nations
† Léo Cadieux left parliament to become ambassador to France and was replaced by Maurice Dupras in a 1970 by-election
†† Raymond Rock crossed the floor on March 12, 1972, over protests that the government gave backbenchers too little influence
†††  Joseph-Alfred Mongrain died in office on December 23, 1970, and was replaced by Claude G. Lajoie in a 1971 by-election

Ontario

* James Elisha Brown was appointed ambassador and was replaced by Derek Blackburn in a 1971 by-election
** On December 3, 1969, Sylvester Perry Ryan left the Liberal Party to sit as an independent, uncomfortable with Trudeau's policies.  On September 11, 1970, he joined the Progressive Conservatives.
*** On May 21, 1971, Paul Hellyer left the Liberal Party to sit as an independent, protesting the government's economic policies.  On July 25, 1972, he joined the Progressive Conservatives.

Manitoba

*  George Muir died in office on August 26, 1970, and was replaced by Jack Murta in a by-election later that year.
** Edward Schreyer left parliament to become leader of the Manitoba NDP and then Premier of Manitoba he was replaced by Doug Rowland in a 1969 by-election.

Saskatchewan

* A.B. Douglas died in office and was replaced by Bill Knight in a 1971 by-election

Alberta

British Columbia

* Richard Durante won in 1968 by only nine votes over Tom Barnett. After several irregularities were found the result was declared void and Tom Barnett won the subsequent redo held on March 8, 1969.
** Colin Cameron died in office and was replaced by Tommy Douglas in a February 10, 1969 by-election

Northern Territories

By-elections

References

Succession

 
Canadian parliaments
1968 establishments in Canada
1972 disestablishments in Canada
1968 in Canadian politics
1969 in Canadian politics
1970 in Canadian politics
1971 in Canadian politics
1972 in Canadian politics